Señorita República Dominicana 1958 was held on April 14, 1958. The pageant had 24 delegates that represented their province. The delegates had to be born in the province they were born. The pageant was held federal palace.  The competition was intro and dresses.  Then in the Top 10, they start with the evening gown, Swim suit and at the top 5 they answer questions, all in the same order. The winner would be in luxury in the city of San Felipe de Puerto Plata. The original pageant was in 1928 where they would crown a delegate from a province. It canceled in 1930 when Trujillo became leader.

Results

Señorita República Dominicana 1958 : Julia Cesarina Acosta Marrón (Espaillat)
1st Runner Up : Angelica Rosario (Provincia de Jarabacoa)
2nd Runner Up : Fausta Espinal (San Rafael)
3rd Runner Up : María Rosario (Puerto Plata) 
4th Runner Up : Germania Ruiz (Barahona)

Top 10

Sandra Medina (Santiago)
Rosario de Las Palmas (Azua)
Cristina de Jesus (Salcedo)
Ana Echavarria (Pedernales)
Myriam Villanueva (José Trujillo Valdez)

Delegates

 Azua - Rosario de Las Palmas Corona
 Baoruco - Isaura Ferro Wendon
 Barahona - Germania Ruiz Xavier
 Benefactor - Carolina Delerion Peralta
 Distrito Nacional - Aimee Catarina Ynoa Mena
 Duarte - Sofia Desireé Melo Duvergé
 Espaillat - Julia Cesarina Acosta Marrón
 José Trujillo Valdez - Myriam Villanueva Rojas
 La Altagracia - María José Tejada Quiros
 La Vega - Teresita Ramos Rodríguez
 Libertador - Marina Ureña Vargas
 Monte Cristi -Mariana Angelita Reyes Albono 

 Provincia de Jarabacoa - Angelica María Rosario Mota
 Pedernales - Ana Silvana Echavarria Abreu
 Puerto Plata - María Altagracia Rosario Ureña
 Salcedo - Cristina de Jesus Toronja
 Samaná - Carina Alejandra Hidalgo Sobrano
 San Pedro de Macorís - Janet Laura Zamora Peña
 San Rafael - Fausta Espinal Camacho
 Santiago - Sandra Alejandrina Medina Mateo
 Santiago Rodríguez - Manuela Abreu Bienvenido
 Séibo - María Reyni Colón Ramos
 Trujillo - Ana María Zaragoza Tarros
 Valverde - María Johanna Tarragona Acosta

Miss Dominican Republic
1958 beauty pageants
1958 in the Dominican Republic